The Sea Haggs were an indie rock band formed in Melbourne, Australia in 1991 by Perth expatriates Laura MacFarlane on guitar, viola, percussion and vocals with Iain McIntyre on guitar, bass and vocals, and Cameron Potts on drums. The band also featured other members, including Yvette Pusser (bass) Nicole (drums) and Ben Butler (percussion). Towards the end of its career, the band also recorded under the name Keckle.

In 1995, the band was wound up when MacFarlane moved to Seattle to join Sleater-Kinney. A compilation of Sea Haggs and Keckle recordings, along with some of MacFarlane's solo work, appeared then under the name "Jelly CD", released by McIntyre's Woozy zine/imprint.

MacFarlane, Potts and McIntyre later went on to form ninetynine.

Members
 Laura MacFarlane — guitar, viola, percussion, vocals
 Iain McIntyre — guitar, bass, vocals
 Cameron Potts — drums
 Yvette Pusser — guitar, bass, vocals
 Nicole  — drums
 Ben Butler — percussion

Discography
 Beastie (1993)
 Jelly (1995)

External links
 MP3s of the Jelly CD compilation

Australian rock music groups
Musical groups from Melbourne
Musical groups disestablished in 1995